Mariand Castrejón Castañeda (born March 13, 1993), better known as Yuya, is a Mexican beauty vlogger and YouTuber.

Early life 
Yuya was born in Cuernavaca, Morelos, Mexico. Her given name, Mariand, is a combination of her parents' names, Maribel and Andrés. She has a brother, Sergio, who also has a YouTube channel. Her uncle gave her the nickname Yuya after the Mexican TV character Yuya, la gorda.

Career 
Yuya created her YouTube channel, called "lady16makeup," in 2009 after winning a YouTube make-up contest when she was 16 years old.

In March 2016, she was one of seven female YouTube creators who joined the United Nations' Sustainable Development Action Campaign, aiming to "achieve gender equality and empower all women and girls."

Yuya has written two books: Los secretos de Yuya (2015) and Las confesiones de Yuya (2016). She released a perfume called #True in July 2015 and a makeup collection in October 2017.

Personal life 

She was in a relationship with Beto Pasillas, also a YouTuber, but broke up in June 2019. She started dating singer Siddhartha in August 2019. On June 12, 2021, Yuya announced she is pregnant via Instagram, and uploaded a video on her channel sharing her experience with pregnancy. On September 29, 2021, their son Mar was born.

Bibliography 
 Los secretos de Yuya (1st edition). Mexico: Planeta. 
 Las confesiones de Yuya (1st edition). Mexico: Planeta.

References

External links
 Yuya on YouTube

1993 births
Living people
Beauty and makeup YouTubers
Mexican bloggers
Mexican YouTubers
Mexican women bloggers
People from Cuernavaca
Spanish-language YouTubers
Video bloggers
YouTube channels launched in 2009
21st-century Mexican women writers